Lili Dujourie (born 1941 in Roeselare, Belgium) is a Flemish visual artist who works primarily in sculptures, paintings, and video. She has had numerous solo and group exhibitions since 1968 and continues to make art today.

Career
The media in which Dujourie works include clay, collage paper, iron, lead, marble, photo, plaster, velvet and video. She personifies the sexuality within her materials, displaying the performative dimension of the artwork. She focuses on what her work is doing externally, rather than simplifying it, giving the ornamental elements of her work a central role. Her subjects center around time, the change between the figurative and the abstract, the sensation of gloominess and searching for an emotional aspect of space.

Nature's Lore
Dujourie's work was exhibited in the Museo Nacional Centro de Arte Reina Sofía from June to September in 2011. In this exhibit, Nature's Lore, the works are all from different points in her career which is amplified by the historical dialogue of each piece. The exhibit is more of a simulation rather than a representation because of its theatrical nature. This exhibit is divided into two parts:
Series One: Initialen der stilte, is composed of clay objects placed on thin tabletops in the forms of bones, leaves, and roots.
Series Two: Composed of small papier-mâché sculptures influenced by the flowers grown in Europe for medicinal purposes.

Video 
Dujourie began to work in video in the 1960s, as an affordable and accessible medium. Her work in painting and sculpture influenced the composition and conceptual framework of the videos she produced. Working with her body, recording herself mostly in the nude, she made feminist statements on the representation of women. In most of her videos, Dujourie filmed herself, alone in a room in a single take. The videos were not edited; they existed as a form of performance documentation. She explored and combatted the male gaze by working as the viewed and the viewer, constantly making recordings to find the perfect forms and movement. Listed are her documented video works:
 Koraal, 1972
 Hommage à...II, 1972
 Hommage à...III, 1972
 Passion, 1972
 Sanguine, 1972
 Une tache, 1972 
 Sonnet, 1972

Exhibitions and installations
Solo Exhibitions:
 S.M.A.K., Ghent, Folds in Time, 2015
 Galerie DAAD, Berlin, 1991
Galerie Michael Janssen, 2011
Iron, plaster and wood, Museo Nacional Centro de Arte Reina Sofía, Spain, 1992
Centro Andaluz de Arte Comptemporaneo, 2004
Centre for Fine Arts, Brussels, 2005
Clay Works, Galerie Erna Hecey, Brussel, 2007
Nature's Lore, Museo Nacional Centro de Arte Reina Sofía, 2011

Notes

1941 births
Living people
20th-century Belgian women artists
21st-century Belgian women artists
Flemish artists
Flemish women artists